The year 2014 is the 5th year in the history of Australian Fighting Championship (AFC), a mixed martial arts promotion based in Australia. In 2014 AFC held 4 events.

Events list

AFC 11 

AFC 11 was an event held on November 22, 2014, at Melbourne Pavilion in Melbourne, Australia.

Results

AFC 10 

AFC 10 was an event held on August 16, 2014, at |Bunton Park in Albury–Wodonga, Australia.

Results

AFC 9 

AFC 9 was an event held on May 17, 2014, at Melbourne Pavilion in Melbourne, Australia.

Results

AFC 8 

AFC 8 was an event held on February, 2014, at Melbourne Pavilion in Melbourne, Australia.

Results

References 

2014 in mixed martial arts
2014 in Australian sport
AFC (mixed martial arts) events